The Harris County Sheriff's Office (HCSO) is a local law enforcement agency serving the over four million citizens of Harris County, Texas, United States. It is headquartered on the first and second floors in the 1200 Baker Street Jail in Downtown Houston.

As of the 2010 U.S. census, the county had a population of 4.1 million, making it the most populous county in Texas and the third most populous county in the United States. Its county seat is Houston.  The Harris County Sheriff's Office has approximately 3,500 employees and is the largest sheriff's office in the state of Texas and the sixth largest in the nation. The number one and two largest sheriff's offices in the nation are respectively the Los Angeles County Sheriff's Department in California and the Cook County Sheriff's Office in Illinois. The third, fourth, and fifth are the Broward County Sheriff's Office in Florida, the Palm Beach County Sheriff's Office in Florida, and the San Diego County Sheriff's Department in California.

In Texas, sheriffs and their deputies are fully empowered peace officers with county-wide jurisdiction and thus, may legally exercise their authority in unincorporated and incorporated areas of their county; they primarily provide law enforcement services for only the unincorporated areas of a county, while yielding to municipal police or city marshals to provide law enforcement services for the incorporated areas. Sheriffs and their deputies also have statewide warrantless arrest powers for any criminal offense (except certain traffic offenses) committed within their presence or view. They also may make arrests with a warrant anywhere in the state. In an emergency, sheriffs along with mayors and district judges are empowered by state law to call forth the National Guard to preserve the peace.

The jurisdiction of the Harris County Sheriff's Office often overlaps with several other law enforcement agencies, among them the Texas Highway Patrol, the eight Harris County Constable Precincts, and several municipal police agencies including the city of Houston Police Department.  The duties of a Texas sheriff generally include keeping the county jail, providing bailiffs for the county and district courts within his county and serving process issued by said courts, and providing general law enforcement services to residents.   The current sheriff of Harris County is Ed Gonzalez, elected in 2016 and has been in office since January 1, 2017.

History

John Moore was sworn in as the first sheriff of what was then called Harrisburg County (later renamed Harris County) in February 1837.  Among the oldest law enforcement agencies in Texas, the department has grown from a single man on horseback to a modern agency with 3500 employees, including over 2500 sworn officers.

On May 31, 2017, John Hernandez died after being placed in a choke hold after a fight by officers Terry Thompson and Chauna Thompson, a married couple. The death was ruled a homicide by the Harris County medical examiner on June 6, 2017, and both Thompsons were charged with murder.

Sheriffs
Harris County sheriffs:

Fallen officers

Since the establishment of the Harris County Sheriff's Department, 45 officers have died in the line of duty.

Correction facilities

The Harris County Sheriff's Office's correction facilities are located in Downtown Houston, all within a block of one another. They include the 1200 Jail (located at 1200 Baker Street), the 701 Jail, and the 1307 Jail. Previously 1301 Franklin and 301 San Jacinto were jails.

 the Harris County jail facilities together have a capacity for 9,434 inmates; at time they have held over 12,000. Due to the excess number of prisoners, the HCSO had to ship inmates to other jails, including some in Louisiana; in June 2010 1,600 Harris County inmates were serving time at other jails. By January 2012 the Harris County jails had 8,573, a decrease by 31% from 2008 to 2012, and there were only 21 inmates serving time in other jail facilities, all in Texas.

The county opened the Atascocita boot camp in 1991, but it closed in September 2004 as the county decided that its rehabilitation value was questionable. The vocational programs, once at the camp, were transferred to the Downtown area.

On February 15, 2023, the Federal Bureau of Investigation opened a federal civil rights investigation into the jail after dozens of inmate deaths in the past few years: 21 in 2021, 28 in 2022, and 4 in the first two months of 2023.

See also

 List of law enforcement agencies in Texas
 Crime in Houston

References

Further reading
 Collier, Kiah. "Sheriff's LGBT jail policy draws praise, questions." Houston Chronicle. November 25, 2013.

External links
 Harris County Sheriff's Office Website
 
 
 Recruiting Video

Sheriff's Office
Sheriffs' departments of Texas